Ceratrichia flandria is a species of butterfly in the family Hesperiidae. It is found in the Democratic Republic of the Congo (Équateur). The habitat consists of forests.

References

Butterflies described in 1956
Hesperiinae
Endemic fauna of the Democratic Republic of the Congo